Kenneth James Fanning (born April 28, 1947) is an American hunting and fishing guide and former politician. In 1980, Fanning was elected to the Alaska House of Representatives as a Libertarian, becoming the second person elected to a U.S. state legislature under that party, following his political mentor Dick Randolph. Fanning served a single term, losing reelection. He later joined the Republican Party and was appointed to fill out a vacancy in the Alaska Senate in 1987, serving in that body for a little over a year.

Early life
Fanning was born on April 28, 1947 in Tampa, Florida. He studied at Colorado State University from 1966 to 1967, then moved to Alaska.  He settled in Fairbanks in 1969, where he studied wildlife management at the University of Alaska (UA) and built a home in the Fairbanks-area suburbs southwest of the university's campus.

He studied at UA through 1970. He worked as a hunting and fishing guide, a trapper, and was also employed at one point by the Alaska Department of Fish and Game. Fanning became involved in politics during the late 1970s, through additional work as a consultant and lobbyist on natural resource and wildlife issues.

Fanning joined the Libertarian Party (LP) around this same time. The visits made to Alaska during the 1976 campaign by Libertarian presidential nominee Roger MacBride and running mate David Bergland spurred interest in the state's LP chapter. Fanning became a protege of Dick Randolph, a Fairbanks insurance agent who served as a Republican in the Alaska House from 1971 to 1974, who himself had joined the LP after meeting MacBride in 1976.

State representative
Fanning was elected in 1980 to a single term in the Alaska House of Representatives as a Libertarian. He followed Randolph, who won election to the House as a Libertarian in 1978 and was reelected alongside Fanning.  Fanning and Randolph represented the Fairbanks North Star Borough as a whole as part of the 20th District, a six-member district without designated seats, alongside Democrats Fred Brown, Brian Rogers and Sally Smith, and Republican Bob Bettisworth. Fanning originally served as a member of the House's minority, and was given a lone committee assignment on the House's Transportation Committee.

During his term in office, redistricting eliminated the system of multi-member, at-large districts.  Running for reelection in 1982, his constituency had been drastically altered.  Fanning was placed in the single-member 21st District, containing the liberal-leaning western portions of the borough. He lost reelection to the late Democratic challenger Niilo Koponen by a nearly two-to-one margin, in a contest with no Republican nominee.

Party switch and state senator
Fanning was one of a number of Alaska Libertarians who left the party in the wake of the schism revealed during its 1983 national convention, joining the Republican Party.  In 1987, Alaska governor Steve Cowper appointed Fanning to a vacancy in the Alaska Senate. Republican incumbent Don Bennett died suddenly at home at age 56. Fanning was a compromise choice, as a feud developed between Randolph and Bev Bennett, Don Bennett's widow, over which one should be appointed to the seat, splitting Fairbanks-area Republicans. Fanning filled out the remainder of Bennett's term and was not a candidate for election to a full term.

Life after politics
Fanning assumed the management of a hunting and fishing lodge in Yakutat, Alaska prior to his election to the House.  Following his Senate tenure, he moved to Yakutat permanently. He eventually became the owner of the business, which his family continues to run today. Most of the lodge's business has centered on fishing excursions in the Situk River. He later began spending winters in Puerto Vallarta, Mexico, where he was involved in the management of a bar.

Personal life
Ken Fanning was married to Jill Kathleen Fanning (1948–2006), who was involved in the real estate business in Fairbanks.

Quote
 "One of the great things about hunting and fishing and trapping, particularly in Alaska, is that you are frequently in areas that are beyond the reach of the law. There's a moral judgment to be made between you and the animal and God."

Bibliography
 (with John Manly) Behind The Scenes in the Alaska Legislature, 1982

References

External links

 Ken Fanning at 100 Years of Alaska's Legislature
 Kenneth J. Fanning at Ballotpedia

1947 births
Living people
20th-century American politicians
20th-century Methodists
21st-century American businesspeople
21st-century Methodists
Alaska Libertarians
Republican Party Alaska state senators
American expatriates in Mexico
Methodists from Alaska
Businesspeople from Fairbanks, Alaska
Businesspeople from Tampa, Florida
Colorado State University alumni
Libertarian Party (United States) officeholders
Republican Party members of the Alaska House of Representatives
Politicians from Fairbanks, Alaska
University of Alaska Fairbanks alumni
Writers from Fairbanks, Alaska